Riverside Secondary School may refer to:
Riverside Secondary School (British Columbia), Port Coquitlam, British Columbia
Riverside Secondary School (Windsor), Windsor, Ontario
Riverside Secondary School (Singapore)